Jean Joseph Bott (9 March 1826 – 28 April 1895) was a German violinist and composer who emigrated to the United States late in his life.

Biography
He was born in Cassel, Germany, where he received his first musical instruction from his father, a court musician. At the age of 9, he was proficient enough to make a performance tour of the Netherlands with his father. After winning a Mozart scholarship in 1841, he began studies of theory and composition under Moritz Hauptmann and violin under Louis Spohr, and after two years of study entered the Cassel court orchestra, where he became concertmaster at the age of 17.

In 1846, he left Cassel to travel through Germany.  He played before William I and was accompanied by Liszt and Meyerbeer. In 1857, he became court kapellmeister at Meiningen, and then in 1865 accepted a similar position in Hanover. In 1877 he went to Magdeburg to direct the Conservatory there, and in 1880 he went to Braunschweig, where he compiled an encyclopedia on musicians and music.  In 1883, he was giving concerts in Hamburg.

In 1885 he came to New York. While in the United States, he made it a practice to visit Hamburg every summer. He reportedly died from grief over the loss of his 1725 Stradivarius violin, which was stolen from him on 31 March 1894. It was his favorite, and he would play on no other in a concert. After Bott's death, a violin was found in the store of Victor S. Fletcher at 23 Union Square which his widow Mathilde (born Blomeyer) said was the stolen violin. She pointed to various identifying features, and two violin makers, August Gemünder and John Friedrich, testified that it was a Stradivarius, contradicting a Mr. Ross who had purchased the violin from Fletcher and said he did not think it a Stradivarius.

Family
In Meiningen, Bott married Matilda Blomeyer in 1861. Their son entered the German army in 1894, and turned 23 in 1895.

Works
His works comprise two operas — Der Unbekannte (The Unknown, 1854) and Aktäa, das Mädchen von Korinth (Actea, the maid from Corinth, 1862) — and symphonies, overtures, violin concertos, pianoforte music, solos for violin, and songs.

Notes

References
 
 

Attribution

External links
  Portrait with signature.

1826 births
1895 deaths
19th-century American composers
19th-century American male musicians
19th-century German musicians
19th-century violinists
American male violinists
American male composers
American violinists
German composers
German emigrants to the United States
German male composers
German violinists
19th-century German male musicians